Five Points is an unincorporated community in Craig Township, Switzerland County, in the U.S. state of Indiana.

Geography

References

Unincorporated communities in Switzerland County, Indiana
Unincorporated communities in Indiana